Notiophilus  germinyi  is a species of ground beetle native to Europe.

References

External links
Images representing Notiophilus germinyi  at Barcode of Life Data System

Notiophilus
Beetles described in 1863
Taxa named by Charles Adolphe Albert Fauvel
Beetles of Europe